Viggo Strømme (born 2 August 1967) is a retired Norwegian football defender and later manager.

He started his career in FK Donn in the mid-1980s and transferred to city rivals IK Start in 1991. From 1995 to 1998 he played for Vålerenga, spending loan time at Lyn in 1998.

In 1999 he was still under contract in Vålerenga, but demoted to the B team. Released in 2000, he joined Frigg as player-manager. After a stint from 2001 to 2007 he became youth coach in Lyn. He was later assistant manager of Lyn in 2014, but was mainly director of sports at the Norwegian School of Elite Sport and has written several football books.

References

1967 births
Living people
Sportspeople from Kristiansand
Norwegian footballers
IK Start players
Vålerenga Fotball players
Lyn Fotball players
Frigg Oslo FK players
Eliteserien players
Norwegian First Division players
Association football defenders
Norwegian football managers
Lyn Fotball non-playing staff